Swan Lake State Park is a public recreation area at the north end of  Swan Lake in the town of Swanville, Waldo County, Maine. The state park's  offer opportunities for swimming, picnicking, canoeing, and fishing. The  lake supports populations of smallmouth bass, landlocked salmon, white perch, brook trout, and wild togue. The park is managed by the Maine Department of Agriculture, Conservation and Forestry.

References

External links
Swan Lake State Park Department of Agriculture, Conservation and Forestry
Swan Lake State Park Brochure Department of Agriculture, Conservation and Forestry

State parks of Maine
Protected areas of Waldo County, Maine
Lakes of Waldo County, Maine
Lakes of Maine